Minister of Finance of Saint Kitts and Nevis is a cabinet minister in charge of the Ministry of Finance of Saint Kitts and Nevis, responsible for public finances of the country. The ministry is located at Government Headquarters, Basseterre

Ministers of Finance

See also 
 Government of Saint Kitts and Nevis
 Economy of Saint Kitts and Nevis

References

External links
 Ministry homepage

Government of Saint Kitts and Nevis
Politics of Saint Kitts and Nevis
Government ministers of Saint Kitts and Nevis

Economy of Saint Kitts and Nevis